SS Oregon may refer to the following steamships:

  built for George Law.
  launched on 5 August 1848 by Smith & Dimon, New York for the Pacific Mail Steamship Company.
  built in Chester, Pennsylvania, once operated by the Oregon Railroad and Navigation Company and wrecked off Alaska in 1906 without any loss of life
 , British passenger liner, sank 1886 (33 km) east of Long Island, New York
 , a former name for the training ship Empire State VI of the State University of New York Maritime College

See also
 
 
 , a Type C1-B ship; launched 29 November 1940 by the Seattle-Tacoma Shipbuilding Corporation, sank in a collision on 10 December 1941

Ship names